Carl LeBlanc (born June 9, 1971) is a Canadian former professional ice hockey defenceman.

Career 
LeBlanc played major junior hockey with the Granby Bisons and Beauport Harfangs of the Quebec Major Junior Hockey League, then went on to play ten seasons in the minor leagues before retiring as a professional player following the 2001–02 season.

Career statistics

References

1971 births
Canadian ice hockey defencemen
Living people
Adirondack IceHawks players
Beauport Harfangs players
Colorado Gold Kings players
Granby Bisons players
Houston Aeros (1994–2013) players
Ice hockey people from Quebec
Knoxville Cherokees players
Knoxville Speed players
Long Beach Ice Dogs (WCHL) players
Portland Pirates players
Quad City Mallards (CoHL) players
Quad City Mallards (UHL) players
South Carolina Stingrays players
Washington Capitals draft picks